This is a list of United Nations Security Council Resolutions 501 to 600 adopted between 25 February 1982 and 19 October 1987.

See also 
 Lists of United Nations Security Council resolutions
 List of United Nations Security Council Resolutions 401 to 500
 List of United Nations Security Council Resolutions 601 to 700

0501